The Mallory Avenue Christian Church (also known as Alberta Abbey), located at 126 NE Alberta Street in Portland, Oregon, is listed on the National Register of Historic Places. The structure is also being consider for Portland Historic Landmark status.

See also
 National Register of Historic Places listings in Northeast Portland, Oregon

References

National Register of Historic Places in Portland, Oregon
Churches in Portland, Oregon
King, Portland, Oregon